Software engineering is an engineering-style system of software development.
A software engineer is a person who applies the principles of software engineering to design, develop, maintain, test, and evaluate computer software. The term programmer is sometimes used as a synonym, but may also lack connotations of engineering education or skills.

Engineering techniques are used to inform the software development process, which involves the definition, implementation, assessment, measurement, management, change, and improvement of the software life cycle process itself. It heavily uses software configuration management, which is about systematically controlling changes to the configuration, and maintaining the integrity and traceability of the configuration and code throughout the system life cycle. Modern processes use software versioning.

History 

Beginning in the 1960s, software engineering was seen as its own type of engineering. Additionally, the development of software engineering was seen as a struggle. It was difficult to keep up with the hardware which caused many problems for software engineers. Problems included software that was over budget, exceeded deadlines, required extensive de-bugging and maintenance, and unsuccessfully met the needs of consumers or was never even completed. In 1968 NATO held the first Software Engineering conference where issues related to software were addressed: guidelines and best practices for the development of software were established.

The origins of the term "software engineering" have been attributed to various sources. The term "software engineering" appeared in a list of services offered by companies in the June 1965 issue of COMPUTERS and AUTOMATION and was used more formally in the August 1966 issue of Communications of the ACM (Volume 9, number 8) “letter to the ACM membership” by the ACM President Anthony A. Oettinger,  it is also associated with the title of a NATO conference in 1968 by Professor Friedrich L. Bauer, the first conference on software engineering. Margaret Hamilton described the discipline "software engineering" during the Apollo missions to give what they were doing legitimacy.  At the time there was perceived to be a "software crisis". The 40th International Conference on Software Engineering (ICSE 2018) celebrates 50 years of "Software Engineering" with the Plenary Sessions' keynotes of Frederick Brooks and Margaret Hamilton.

In 1984, the Software Engineering Institute (SEI) was established as a federally funded research and development center headquartered on the campus of Carnegie Mellon University in Pittsburgh, Pennsylvania, United States. Watts Humphrey founded the SEI Software Process Program, aimed at understanding and managing the software engineering process.  The Process Maturity Levels introduced would become the Capability Maturity Model Integration for Development(CMMI-DEV), which has defined how the US Government evaluates the abilities of a software development team.

Modern, generally accepted best-practices for software engineering have been collected by the ISO/IEC JTC 1/SC 7 subcommittee and published as the Software Engineering Body of Knowledge (SWEBOK). Software engineering is considered one of major computing disciplines.

Definitions and terminology 

Notable definitions of software engineering include:
 "The systematic application of scientific and technological knowledge, methods, and experience to the design, implementation, testing, and documentation of software"—The Bureau of Labor Statistics—IEEE Systems and software engineering – Vocabulary
 "The application of a systematic, disciplined, quantifiable approach to the development, operation, and maintenance of software"—IEEE Standard Glossary of Software Engineering Terminology
 "an engineering discipline that is concerned with all aspects of software production"—Ian Sommerville
 "the establishment and use of sound engineering principles in order to economically obtain software that is reliable and works efficiently on real machines"—Fritz Bauer
"a branch of computer science that deals with the design, implementation, and maintenance of complex computer programs"—Merriam-Webster
 "'software engineering' encompasses not just the act of writing code, but all of the tools and processes an organization uses to build and maintain that code over time. [...] Software engineering can be thought of as 'programming integrated over time.'"—Software Engineering at Google

The term has also been used less formally:
 as the informal contemporary term for the broad range of activities that were formerly called computer programming and systems analysis;
 as the broad term for all aspects of the practice of computer programming, as opposed to the theory of computer programming, which is formally studied as a sub-discipline of computer science;
 as the term embodying the advocacy of a specific approach to computer programming, one that urges that it be treated as an engineering discipline rather than an art or a craft, and advocates the codification of recommended practices.

Etymology of "software engineer" 
Margaret Hamilton promoted the term "software engineering" during her work on the Apollo program. The term "engineering" was used to acknowledge that the work should be taken just as seriously as other contributions toward the advancement of technology. Hamilton details her use of the term:When I first came up with the term, no one had heard of it before, at least in our world. It was an ongoing joke for a long time. They liked to kid me about my radical ideas. It was a memorable day when one of the most respected hardware gurus explained to everyone in a meeting that he agreed with me that the process of building software should also be considered an engineering discipline, just like with hardware. Not because of his acceptance of the new "term" per se, but because we had earned his and the acceptance of the others in the room as being in an engineering field in its own right.

Suitability of the term 
Individual commentators have disagreed sharply on how to define software engineering or its legitimacy as an engineering discipline. David Parnas has said that software engineering is, in fact, a form of engineering. Steve McConnell has said that it is not, but that it should be. Donald Knuth has said that programming is an art and a science. Edsger W. Dijkstra claimed that the terms software engineering and software engineer have been misused  and should be considered harmful, particularly in the United States.

Tasks in large scale projects

Software requirements 

Requirements engineering is about the elicitation, analysis, specification, and validation of requirements for software. Software requirements can be of three different types. There are functional requirements, non-functional requirements, and domain requirements. The operation of the software should be performed and the proper output should be expected for the user to use. Non-functional requirements deal with issues like portability, security, maintainability, reliability, scalability, performance, reusability, and flexibility. They are classified into the following types: interface constraints, performance constraints (such as response time, security, storage space, etc.), operating constraints, life cycle constraints (maintainability, portability, etc.), and economic constraints. Knowledge of how the system or software works is needed when it comes to specifying non-functional requirements. Domain requirements have to do with the characteristic of a certain category or domain of projects.

Software design 

Software design is about the process of defining the architecture, components, interfaces, and other characteristics of a system or component. This is also called software architecture. Software design is divided into three different levels of design. The three levels are interface design, architectural design, and detailed design. Interface design is the interaction between a system and its environment. This happens at a high level of abstraction along with the inner workings of the system. Architectural design has to do with the major components of a system and their responsibilities, properties, interfaces, and their relationships and interactions that occur between them. Detailed design is the internal elements of all the major system components, their properties, relationships, processing, and usually their algorithms and the data structures.

Software construction 

Software construction, the main activity of software development, is the combination of programming, unit testing, integration testing, and debugging. Testing during this phase is generally performed by the programmer while the software is under construction, to verify what was just written and decide when the code is ready to be sent to the next step.

Software testing 

Software testing is an empirical, technical investigation conducted to provide stakeholders with information about the quality of the product or service under test, with different approaches such as unit testing and integration testing. It is one aspect of software quality. As a separate phase in software development, it is typically performed by quality assurance staff or a developer other than the one who wrote the code.

Software analysis 

Software analysis is the process of analyzing the behavior of computer programs regarding a property such as performance, robustness, and security It can be performed without executing the program (static program analysis), during runtime (dynamic program analysis) or in a combination of both.

Software maintenance 

Software maintenance refers to the activities required to provide cost-effective support after shipping the software product. Software maintenance is modifying and updating software applications after distribution to correct faults and to improve its performance. Software has a lot to do with the real world and when the real world changes, software maintenance is required. Software maintenance includes: error correction, optimization, deletion of unused and discarded features, and enhancement of features that already exist. Usually, maintenance takes up about 40% to 80% of the project cost therefore, focusing on maintenance keeps the costs down.

Education 

Knowledge of computer programming is a prerequisite for becoming a software engineer. In 2004 the IEEE Computer Society produced the SWEBOK, which has been published as ISO/IEC Technical Report 1979:2005, describing the body of knowledge that they recommend to be mastered by a graduate software engineer with four years of experience.
Many software engineers enter the profession by obtaining a university degree or training at a vocational school. One standard international curriculum for undergraduate software engineering degrees was defined by the Joint Task Force on Computing Curricula of the IEEE Computer Society and the Association for Computing Machinery, and updated in 2014.

In addition to university education, many companies sponsor internships for students wishing to pursue careers in information technology. These internships can introduce the student to interesting real-world tasks that typical software engineers encounter every day. Similar experience can be gained through military service in software engineering.

Software engineering degree programs
Half of all practitioners today have degrees in computer science, information systems, or information technology. A small, but growing, number of practitioners have software engineering degrees. In 1987, the Department of Computing at Imperial College London introduced the first three-year software engineering Bachelor's degree in the UK and the world; in the following year, the University of Sheffield established a similar program.  In 1996, the Rochester Institute of Technology established the first software engineering bachelor's degree program in the United States, however, it did not obtain ABET accreditation until 2003, the same time as Rice University, Clarkson University, Milwaukee School of Engineering and Mississippi State University obtained theirs. In 1997, PSG College of Technology in Coimbatore, India was the first to start a five-year integrated Master of Science degree in Software Engineering.

Since then, software engineering undergraduate degrees have been established at many universities. A standard international curriculum for undergraduate software engineering degrees, SE2004, was defined by a steering committee between 2001 and 2004 with funding from the Association for Computing Machinery and the IEEE Computer Society. , in the U.S., about 50 universities offer software engineering degrees, which teach both computer science and engineering principles and practices. The first software engineering Master's degree was established at Seattle University in 1979. Since then graduate software engineering degrees have been made available from many more universities.  Likewise in Canada, the Canadian Engineering Accreditation Board (CEAB) of the Canadian Council of Professional Engineers has recognized several software engineering programs.

In 1998, the US Naval Postgraduate School (NPS) established the first doctorate program in Software Engineering in the world. Additionally, many online advanced degrees in Software Engineering have appeared such as the Master of Science in Software Engineering (MSE) degree offered through the Computer Science and Engineering Department at California State University, Fullerton. Steve McConnell opines that because most universities teach computer science rather than software engineering, there is a shortage of true software engineers. ETS (École de technologie supérieure) University and UQAM (Université du Québec à Montréal) were mandated by IEEE to develop the Software Engineering Body of Knowledge (SWEBOK), which has become an ISO standard describing the body of knowledge covered by a software engineer.

Profession 

Legal requirements for the licensing or certification of professional software engineers vary around the world. In the UK, there is no licensing or legal requirement to assume or use the job title Software Engineer.  In some areas of Canada, such as Alberta, British Columbia, Ontario, and Quebec, software engineers can hold the Professional Engineer (P.Eng) designation and/or the Information Systems Professional (I.S.P.) designation. In Europe, Software Engineers can obtain the European Engineer (EUR ING) professional title.

The United States, since 2013, has offered an NCEES Professional Engineer exam for Software Engineering, thereby allowing Software Engineers to be licensed and recognized. NCEES will end the exam after April 2019 due to lack of participation. Mandatory licensing is currently still largely debated, and perceived as controversial. In some parts of the US such as Texas, the use of the term Engineer is regulated by law and reserved only for use by individuals who have a Professional Engineer license.

The IEEE Computer Society and the ACM, the two main US-based professional organizations of software engineering, publish guides to the profession of software engineering. The IEEE's Guide to the Software Engineering Body of Knowledge – 2004 Version, or SWEBOK, defines the field and describes the knowledge the IEEE expects a practicing software engineer to have. The most current SWEBOK v3 is an updated version and was released in 2014. The IEEE also promulgates a "Software Engineering Code of Ethics".

Employment 

There are an estimated 26.9 million professional software engineers in the world as of 2022, up from 21 million in 2016.

Many software engineers work as employees or contractors. Software engineers work with businesses, government agencies (civilian or military), and non-profit organizations. Some software engineers work for themselves as freelancers. Some organizations have specialists to perform each of the tasks in the software development process. Other organizations require software engineers to do many or all of them. In large projects, people may specialize in only one role. In small projects, people may fill several or all roles at the same time. Many companies hire interns, often university or college students during a summer break, or externships. Specializations include analysts, architects, developers, testers, technical support, middleware analysts, project managers, educators, and researchers.

Most software engineers and programmers work 40 hours a week, but about 15 percent of software engineers and 11 percent of programmers worked more than 50 hours a week in 2008. Potential injuries in these occupations are possible because like other workers who spend long periods sitting in front of a computer terminal typing at a keyboard, engineers and programmers are susceptible to eyestrain, back discomfort, and hand and wrist problems such as carpal tunnel syndrome.

United States 
The U. S. Bureau of Labor Statistics (BLS) counted 1,365,500 software developers holding jobs in the U.S. in 2018. Due to its relative newness as a field of study, formal education in software engineering is often taught as part of a computer science curriculum, and many software engineers hold computer science degrees. The BLS estimates from 2014 to 2024 that computer software engineering would increase by 17% . This is down from the 2012 to 2022 BLS estimate of 22% for software engineering. And, is further down from their 30% 2010 to 2020 BLS estimate. Due to this trend, job growth may not be as fast as during the last decade, as jobs that would have gone to computer software engineers in the United States would instead be outsourced to computer software engineers in countries such as India and other foreign countries. In addition, the BLS Job Outlook for Computer Programmers, 2014–24 predicts an −8% (a decline, in their words), then a decline in the Job Outlook, 2019-29 of -9%, and a 10% decline for 2021-2031 for those who program computers. Furthermore, women in many software fields has also been declining over the years as compared to other engineering fields. However, this trend may change or slow in the future as many current software engineers in the U.S. market leave the profession or age out of the market in the next few decades.

Certification 
The Software Engineering Institute offers certifications on specific topics like security, process improvement and software architecture. IBM, Microsoft and other companies also sponsor their own certification examinations. Many IT certification programs are oriented toward specific technologies, and managed by the vendors of these technologies. These certification programs are tailored to the institutions that would employ people who use these technologies.

Broader certification of general software engineering skills is available through various professional societies. , the IEEE had certified over 575 software professionals as a Certified Software Development Professional (CSDP). In 2008 they added an entry-level certification known as the Certified Software Development Associate (CSDA). The ACM had a professional certification program in the early 1980s, which was discontinued due to lack of interest. The ACM examined the possibility of professional certification of software engineers in the late 1990s, but eventually decided that such certification was inappropriate for the professional industrial practice of software engineering.

In the U.K. the British Computer Society has developed a legally recognized professional certification called Chartered IT Professional (CITP), available to fully qualified members (MBCS). Software engineers may be eligible for membership of the Institution of Engineering and Technology and so qualify for Chartered Engineer status. In Canada the Canadian Information Processing Society has developed a legally recognized professional certification called Information Systems Professional (ISP). In Ontario, Canada, Software Engineers who graduate from a Canadian Engineering Accreditation Board (CEAB) accredited program, successfully complete PEO's (Professional Engineers Ontario) Professional Practice Examination (PPE) and have at least 48 months of acceptable engineering experience are eligible to be licensed through the Professional Engineers Ontario and can become Professional Engineers P.Eng. The PEO does not recognize any online or distance education however; and does not consider Computer Science programs to be equivalent to software engineering programs despite the tremendous overlap between the two. This has sparked controversy and a certification war. It has also held the number of P.Eng holders for the profession exceptionally low. The vast majority of working professionals in the field hold a degree in CS, not SE. Given the difficult certification path for holders of non-SE degrees, most never bother to pursue the license.

Impact of globalization 
The initial impact of outsourcing, and the relatively lower cost of international human resources in developing third world countries led to a massive migration of software development activities from corporations in North America and Europe to India and later: China, Russia, and other developing countries. This approach had some flaws, mainly the distance / time zone difference that prevented human interaction between clients and developers and the massive job transfer. This had a negative impact on many aspects of the software engineering profession. For example, some students in the developed world avoid education related to software engineering because of the fear of offshore outsourcing (importing software products or services from other countries) and of being displaced by foreign visa workers. Although statistics do not currently show a threat to software engineering itself; a related career, computer programming does appear to have been affected. Nevertheless, the ability to smartly leverage offshore and near-shore resources via the follow-the-sun workflow has improved the overall operational capability of many organizations. When North Americans are leaving work, Asians are just arriving to work. When Asians are leaving work, Europeans are arriving to work. This provides a continuous ability to have human oversight on business-critical processes 24 hours per day, without paying overtime compensation or disrupting a key human resource, sleep patterns.

While global outsourcing has several advantages, global – and generally distributed – development can run into serious difficulties resulting from the distance between developers. This is due to the key elements of this type of distance that have been identified as geographical, temporal, cultural and communication (that includes the use of different languages and dialects of English in different locations). Research has been carried out in the area of global software development over the last 15 years and an extensive body of relevant work published that highlights the benefits and problems associated with the complex activity. As with other aspects of software engineering research is ongoing in this and related areas.

Prizes 
There are several prizes in the field of software engineering:
 The Codie awards is a yearly award issued by the Software and Information Industry Association for excellence in software development within the software industry.
 Jolt Awards are awards in the software industry.
 Stevens Award is a software engineering award given in memory of Wayne Stevens.
 Harlan Mills Award for "contributions to the theory and practice of the information sciences, focused on software engineering".

Criticism 
Software engineering sees its practitioners as individuals who follow well-defined engineering approaches to problem-solving. These approaches are specified in various software engineering books and research papers, always with the connotations of predictability, precision, mitigated risk and professionalism. This perspective has led to calls for licensing, certification and codified bodies of knowledge as mechanisms for spreading the engineering knowledge and maturing the field.

Software engineering extends engineering and draws on the engineering model, i.e. engineering process, engineering project management, engineering requirements, engineering design, engineering construction, and engineering validation. The concept is so new that it is rarely understood, and it is widely misinterpreted, including in software engineering textbooks, papers, and among the communities of programmers and crafters.

One of the core issues in software engineering is that its approaches are not empirical enough because a real-world validation of approaches is usually absent, or very limited and hence software engineering is often misinterpreted as feasible only in a "theoretical environment."

Edsger Dijkstra, the founder of many of the concepts used within software development today, rejected the idea of "software engineering" up until his death in 2002, arguing that those terms were poor analogies for what
he called the "radical novelty" of computer science:

See also

Study and practice
 Computer science
 Data engineering
 Software craftsmanship
 Software development
 Release engineering

Roles
 Programmer
 Systems analyst
 Systems architect

Professional aspects
 Bachelor of Science in Information Technology
 Bachelor of Software Engineering
 List of software engineering conferences
 List of computer science journals (including software engineering journals)
 Software Engineering Institute

References

Citations

Sources

Further reading

External links 

 Guide to the Software Engineering Body of Knowledge
 The Open Systems Engineering and Software Development Life Cycle Framework OpenSDLC.org the integrated Creative Commons SDLC
 Software Engineering Institute Carnegie Mellon

 
Engineering disciplines